Axel Johnson (May 22, 1870September 25, 1924) was a Danish American immigrant, dairy farmer, and progressive Republican politician from Polk County, Wisconsin.  He represented Polk County for five terms in the Wisconsin State Assembly (1909, 1911, 1913, 1915, 1919).  He was a key figure in Wisconsin's ratification of the Eighteenth Amendment to the United States Constitution (Prohibition).

Biography
Axel Johnson was born in Denmark on May 22, 1870, and was raised and educated there.  He emigrated to the United States as a young man, he lived in Minneapolis, Minnesota, and took night classes studying agriculture.  He went to work as a farm hand on a dairy farm in Kandiyohi County, Minnesota.  After that, he traveled the west, working in Colorado and Wyoming for two years, then spent three years in Traill County, North Dakota, working as a farm foreman.

He settled in Polk County, Wisconsin, in 1892, and purchased 40 acres of land in the town of Apple River.  He subsequently purchased another 140 acres in the neighboring town of Beaver.  He operated his land as a dairy farm and cattle ranch.

He became active in local affairs and was elected to several terms as town clerk, member of the school board, and justice of the peace.  He helped organize the Apple River and Beaver Creamery and served as secretary and manager of that organization, and was also a stockholder and director of the Polk County Cooperative Association.

He was elected to the Wisconsin State Assembly in 1908, running on the Republican Party ticket, and was re-elected in 1910.  In his first two terms, he represented the district that comprised both Burnett and Polk counties.  Following the redistricting act of 1911, Polk County became its own Assembly district.  Johnson was elected to represent that district again in 1912, 1914, and 1918.  

In 1916, Johnson ran for Wisconsin Senate in the vacant 29th State Senate district, but lost in the primary to Algodt C. Anderson.  There was also some discussion at the beginning of 1916 that the  faction of the Republican party might want to run Johnson as a candidate in a primary challenge against congressman Irvine Lenroot, but that challenge was ultimately abandoned in favor of the Senate race.

During his final term in the Assembly in 1919–1920, he was chairman of the committee on State Affairs, and was one of the leaders of the prohibition movement.  He lead the effort in the Wisconsin Legislature to ratify the Eighteenth Amendment to the United States Constitution, and then worked on the passage of Wisconsin's legislation for the enforcement of prohibition.

During that session, he was also the author of the so-called "dog tax", which created a licensing requirement for owning a dog—each dog required a license, the owner would have to pay a fee for each license.  The new fees created an uproar, beginning in Johnson's home county of Polk, with hundreds of dog owners declaring their refusal to pay.

Johnson did not stand for re-election in 1920.

Personal life and family
Axel Johnson was a son of Christ and Johanna ( Peterson) Johnson.

He married Carrie "Lizzie" Peterson, a daughter of Danish immigrants, on December 5, 1894.  They had six children.

Electoral history

Wisconsin Assembly (1908, 1910)

| colspan="6" style="text-align:center;background-color: #e9e9e9;"| General Election, November 3, 1908

| colspan="6" style="text-align:center;background-color: #e9e9e9;"| General Election, November 8, 1910

Wisconsin Assembly (1912, 1914)

| colspan="6" style="text-align:center;background-color: #e9e9e9;"| General Election, November 5, 1912

| colspan="6" style="text-align:center;background-color: #e9e9e9;"| General Election, November 3, 1914

Wisconsin Senate (1916)

| colspan="6" style="text-align:center;background-color: #e9e9e9;"| Republican Primary, September 5, 1916

Wisconsin Assembly (1918)

| colspan="6" style="text-align:center;background-color: #e9e9e9;"| General Election, November 5, 1918

References

|-
 

1870 births
1924 deaths
Danish emigrants to the United States
Politicians from Minneapolis
Farmers from Minnesota
Farmers from Wisconsin
American ranchers
People from Polk County, Wisconsin
20th-century American politicians
Republican Party members of the Wisconsin State Assembly
Prohibition in the United States